Giacomo Edoardo Tarsis di Castel d'Agogna (9 December 1906 – 25 October 1978) was a sailor from Italy who represented his country at the 1928 Summer Olympics in Amsterdam, Netherlands.

References

Sailors at the 1928 Summer Olympics – 6 Metre
Olympic sailors of Italy
Italian male sailors (sport)
1906 births
1978 deaths